HD 53143 is a star in the Carina constellation, located about  from the Earth. With an apparent visual magnitude of 6.80, this star is a challenge to view with the naked eye even under ideal viewing conditions.

Using the technique of gyrochronology, which measures the age of a low-mass star based on its rotation, HD 53143 is about  old. Depending on the source, the stellar classification for this star is G9 V or K1V, placing it near the borderline between G-type and K-type main sequence stars. In either case, it is generating energy through the thermonuclear fusion of hydrogen at its core. This star is smaller than the Sun, with about 85% of the Sun's radius. It is emitting only 70% of the Sun's luminosity. The effective temperature of the star's outer envelope is cooler than the Sun at 5,224 K, giving it a golden-orange hue.

Based upon an excess of infrared emission, a circumstellar debris disk has been found in this sysyem. (For comparison, the mass of the Moon is 7.3477 × 1022 kg.) This is one of the oldest known debris disk systems and hence may be replenished through the collision of larger bodies. The observed inner edge of the disk is at a distance of 55 Astronomical Units (AU) from the host star, while it stretches out to twice that distance, or 110 AU. This debris disk may extend outside this range, as the measurements are limited by the sensitivity of the instruments. The dust appears evenly distributed with no indication of clumping. The eccentricity of the ring is also one of the highest known, at 0.21.

References

Carina (constellation)
G-type main-sequence stars
K-type main-sequence stars
053143
Circumstellar disks
Durchmusterung objects
0260
003690